Ask Me to Dance is the third studio album by actor and singer Minnie Driver, and was released in 2014.

Track listing

References

2014 albums
Covers albums
Minnie Driver albums
Zoë Records albums